The 1982 Rice Owls football team was an American football team that represented Rice University in the Southwest Conference during the 1982 NCAA Division I-A football season. In their fifth year under head coach Ray Alborn, the team compiled an 0–11 record.

Schedule

References

Rice
Rice Owls football seasons
College football winless seasons
Rice Owls football